Dayne Wescott was a member of the Wisconsin State Senate.

Biography
Wescott was born on December 11, 1850 in Oshkosh, Wisconsin. He died on July 7, 1929 in Shawano, Wisconsin.

Career
Wescott was elected to the Senate in 1892. Previously, he was Register of Deeds of Shawano County, Wisconsin from 1873 to 1877; Clerk of Shawano County from 1879 to 1883 and Treasurer of Shawano County from 1885 to 1889. He was a Democrat.

References

External links

Politicians from Oshkosh, Wisconsin
People from Shawano County, Wisconsin
Democratic Party Wisconsin state senators
1850 births
1929 deaths